Britcoin may refer to:

 A crypto-currency exchange founded by Amir Taaki
 The Digital pound, a proposed digital currency to be issued by the Bank of England